is a Japanese former professional baseball pitcher in Nippon Professional Baseball (NPB). He played for the Sankei Atoms / Yakult Atoms / Yakult Swallows. He won the Eiji Sawamura Award in 1978.

References

1947 births
Living people
Japanese baseball players
Nippon Professional Baseball pitchers
Sankei Atoms players
Yakult Atoms players
Yakult Swallows players
Japanese baseball coaches
Nippon Professional Baseball coaches